This article contains a list of New Age topics that are too extensive to include in its main article New Age; further information may be found at :Category:New Age.

Philosophical

 Baqaa
 Destiny
 Esoteric cosmology
 Esotericism
 Fanaa
 Hierology
 Integral (spirituality)
 Integral theory
 Karma
 Multi-dimensionality
 Mythology
 Natural order (philosophy) 
 Spirituality
 Synchronicity
 Syncretism
 Transcendence (philosophy)
 Vedas
 Western esotericism

Movement

Influences

 Buddhism
 Zen
 Hinduism
 Neopaganism
 Modern paganism and New Age
 Postmodernism
 Science
 Theosophy
 Transpersonal psychology
 Universalism

Proponents

Historical

 Alice Bailey
 Edgar Cayce
 George Gurdjieff
 Carl Jung
 Rudolf Steiner

Contemporary

 A. H. Almaas
 Khwaja Shamsuddin Azeemi
 Lee Carroll
 Carlos Castaneda
 Deepak Chopra
 Andrew Cohen
 Benjamin Creme
 Da Free John
 Ram Dass
 Wayne Dyer
 Linda Goodman
 Willis Harman
 Louise Hay
 Esther Hicks
 Hisham Kabbani
 Barry Long
 Shirley MacLaine
 Caroline Myss
 Leonard Orr
 Johann Quanier
 Rajneesh
 Mark Satin
 David Spangler
 Marshall Vian Summers
 Tiziano Terzani
 Eckhart Tolle
 Neale Donald Walsch
 Ken Wilber
 Marianne Williamson

Astrology

 Age of Aquarius
 Aquarius (constellation)
 Astrological age
 Harmonic Convergence
 Horoscope
 Zodiac

Social movements

 2012 phenomenon
 Encounter group
 Findhorn Ecovillage
 Human Potential Movement
 Hundredth monkey effect
 Large Group Awareness Training (LGAT)
 LOHAS (Lifestyles of Health and Sustainability, a U.S. marketing study)
 New Age communities
 New Age Gaian
 New Age travellers
 New World Alliance
 Rebirthing-breathwork
 Sacred travel

Meditative

 Affirmations (New Age)
 Altered state of consciousness
 Bhakti
 Dhikr
 Kundalini energy
 Mandala
 Meditation
 Muraqaba
 Prayer
 Qi
 Qigong
 Tantra

Music

 Ambient music
 Circle dance
 Drum circle
 Hare Krishna
 Kirtan
 Nambassa
 New-age music
 Grammy Award for Best New Age Album
 Neoclassical new-age music
 Qawwali
 Sufi whirling

Spiritual/Religious

 A Course in Miracles
 Angels
 Anthroposophy
 Christian anarchism
 Cosmic ordering
 Dances of Universal Peace
 Eckankar
 Goddess movement
 Ietsism
 Jesus
 Kabbalah
 Living Enrichment Center
 New religious movements
 New Thought
 Outline of spirituality
 Rosicrucian
 Shamanism
 Soulmate
 Spirit
 Spirit guides
 Spiritism
 Sufism
 The Aquarian Gospel of Jesus the Christ
 Wicca

Holistic health

 Acupuncture
 Alternative medicine
 Aromatherapy
 Ayurveda
 Biorhythms
 Brainwaves
 Breatharians
 Chakras
 Chromotherapy
 Creative visualization
 Crystal healing
 Emotional Freedom Technique (EFT)
 Energy (esotericism)
 Fruitarianism
 Homeopathy
 Hypnosis
 Iridology
 Kirlian photography
 Lotus birth
 Menstrual cup
 Neuro-Linguistic Programming (NLP)
 Organic food
 Pyramid power
 Reiki
 Self-help
 Therapeutic touch
 Veganism
 Vegetarianism
 Vitalism
 Wellness (alternative medicine)

Consciousness

 2012 phenomenon
 Angels
 Anomalous phenomena
 Astral projection
 Aura (paranormal)
 Elementals
 Gaia hypothesis
 Gaia philosophy
 Lucid Dreaming
 Near death experience
 Out-of-body experience
 Paradigm shift
 Past life regression
 Perception
 Psi (parapsychology)
 Reincarnation
 Soul travel
 Subtle body

Special abilities

 Automatic writing
 Charismatics
 Clairvoyance
 Dreaming
 Extrasensory perception
 Indigo children
 Levitation
 Longevity
 Mediumship
 Oracles
 Palmistry
 Parapsychology
 Psychokinesis
 Remote viewing
 Telepathy
 Time travel

Geographic energy centers

 Atlantis
 Avalon
 Bermuda Triangle
 Earth
 Earth mysteries
 Kun Lun Mountains
 Lemuria (continent)
 Ley lines
 Machu Picchu
 Mount Kailash
 Mu (lost continent)
 Shambhala
 Shangri-La
 Stonehenge

Systems of the physical world

 Alchemy
 Astrology
 Ceremonial magic
 Chaos magic
 Feng shui
 Magic (paranormal)
 Magick
 Numerology
 Odic force
 Sex magic
 Tarot
 Vastu Shastra

Extraterrestrial life

 Alien abduction
 Alien implants
 Ancient astronauts
 Ancient civilizations
 Archaeoastronomy
 Area 51
 Cattle mutilation
 Crop circle
 Hollow Earth
 Nazca Lines
 Unidentified flying object
 Star Seeds

Topics
Religion-related lists
Outlines of religions
Wikipedia outlines